Myrna Aileen Katz is a South African former cricketer who played as a batter. She appeared in two Test matches for South Africa in 1972, both against New Zealand, scoring 46 runs in three innings. She played domestic cricket for Southern Transvaal.

References

External links
 
 

Living people
Date of birth missing (living people)
Year of birth missing (living people)
Cricketers from Johannesburg
South African women cricketers
South Africa women Test cricketers
Central Gauteng women cricketers